Fermium (100Fm) is a synthetic element, and thus a standard atomic weight cannot be given. Like all artificial elements, it has no stable isotopes. The first isotope to be discovered (in fallout from nuclear testing) was 255Fm in 1952. 250Fm was independently synthesized shortly after the discovery of 255Fm. There are 20 known radioisotopes ranging in atomic mass from 241Fm to 260Fm (260Fm is unconfirmed), and 2 nuclear isomers, 250mFm and 251mFm. The longest-lived isotope is 257Fm with a half-life of 100.5 days, and the longest-lived isomer is 250mFm with a half-life of 1.92 seconds.

List of isotopes 

|-
| rowspan=2|241Fm
| rowspan=2 style="text-align:right" | 100
| rowspan=2 style="text-align:right" | 141
| rowspan=2|241.07421(32)#
| rowspan=2|730(60) μs
| SF(>78%)
| (various)
| rowspan=2|5/2#+
|-
| α (<14%)
| 237Cf
|-
| rowspan=2|242Fm
| rowspan=2 style="text-align:right" | 100
| rowspan=2 style="text-align:right" | 142
| rowspan=2|242.07343(43)#
| rowspan=2|0.8(2) ms
| SF
| (various)
| rowspan=2|0+
|-
| α (rare)
| 238Cf
|-
| rowspan=3|243Fm
| rowspan=3 style="text-align:right" | 100
| rowspan=3 style="text-align:right" | 143
| rowspan=3|243.07447(23)#
| rowspan=3|231(9) ms
| α (91%)
| 239Cf
| rowspan=3|7/2−#
|-
| SF (9%)
| (various)
|-
| β+ (rare)
| 243Es
|-
| rowspan=2|244Fm
| rowspan=2 style="text-align:right" | 100
| rowspan=2 style="text-align:right" | 144
| rowspan=2|244.07404(22)#
| rowspan=2|3.12(8) ms
| SF (99%)
| (various)
| rowspan=2|0+
|-
| α (1%)
| 240Cf
|-
| rowspan=3|245Fm
| rowspan=3 style="text-align:right" | 100
| rowspan=3 style="text-align:right" | 145
| rowspan=3|245.07535(21)#
| rowspan=3|4.2(13) s
| α (95.7%)
| 241Cf
| rowspan=3|1/2+#
|-
| β+ (4.2%)
| 245Es
|-
| SF (.13%)
| (various)
|-
| rowspan=4|246Fm
| rowspan=4 style="text-align:right" | 100
| rowspan=4 style="text-align:right" | 146
| rowspan=4|246.075350(17)
| rowspan=4|1.54(4) s
| α (85%)
| 242Cf
| rowspan=4|0+
|-
| β+ (10%)
| 246Es
|-
| β+, SF (10%)
| (various)
|-
| SF (4.5%)
| (various)
|-
| rowspan=2|247Fm
| rowspan=2 style="text-align:right" | 100
| rowspan=2 style="text-align:right" | 147
| rowspan=2|247.07695(12)#
| rowspan=2|31(1) s
| α (>50%)
| 243Cf
| rowspan=2|(7/2+)
|-
| β+ (<50%)
| 247Es
|-
| rowspan=3|248Fm
| rowspan=3 style="text-align:right" | 100
| rowspan=3 style="text-align:right" | 148
| rowspan=3|248.077186(9)
| rowspan=3|35.1(8) s
| α (93%)
| 244Cf
| rowspan=3|0+
|-
| β+ (7%)
| 248Es
|-
| SF (.10%)
| (various)
|-
| rowspan=2|249Fm
| rowspan=2 style="text-align:right" | 100
| rowspan=2 style="text-align:right" | 149
| rowspan=2|249.078928(7)
| rowspan=2|1.6(1) min
| β+ (85%)
| 249Es
| rowspan=2|(7/2+)#
|-
| α (15%)
| 245Cf
|-
| rowspan=3|250Fm
| rowspan=3 style="text-align:right" | 100
| rowspan=3 style="text-align:right" | 150
| rowspan=3|250.079521(9)
| rowspan=3|30.4(15) min
| α (90%)
| 246Cf
| rowspan=3|0+
|-
| EC (10%)
| 250Es
|-
| SF (6.9×10−3%)
| (various)
|-
| style="text-indent:1em" | 250mFm
| colspan="3" style="text-indent:2em" | 1199.2(10) keV
| 1.92(5) s
| IT
| 250Fm
| (8−)
|-
| rowspan=2|251Fm
| rowspan=2 style="text-align:right" | 100
| rowspan=2 style="text-align:right" | 151
| rowspan=2|251.081540(16)
| rowspan=2|5.30(8) h
| β+ (98.2%)
| 251Es
| rowspan=2|(9/2−)
|-
| α (1.8%)
| 247Cf
|-
| style="text-indent:1em" | 251mFm
| colspan="3" style="text-indent:2em" | 200.09(11) keV
| 21.1(16) μs
|
|
| (5/2+)
|-
| rowspan=3|252Fm
| rowspan=3 style="text-align:right" | 100
| rowspan=3 style="text-align:right" | 152
| rowspan=3|252.082467(6)
| rowspan=3|25.39(4) h
| α (99.99%)
| 248Cf
| rowspan=3|0+
|-
| SF (.0023%)
| (various)
|-
| β+β+ (rare)
| 252Cf
|-
| rowspan=2|253Fm
| rowspan=2 style="text-align:right" | 100
| rowspan=2 style="text-align:right" | 153
| rowspan=2|253.085185(4)
| rowspan=2|3.00(12) d
| EC (88%)
| 253Es
| rowspan=2|(1/2)+
|-
| α (12%)
| 249Cf
|-
| rowspan=2|254Fm
| rowspan=2 style="text-align:right" | 100
| rowspan=2 style="text-align:right" | 154
| rowspan=2|254.0868544(30)
| rowspan=2|3.240(2) h
| α (99.94%)
| 250Cf
| rowspan=2|0+
|-
| SF (.0592%)
| (various)
|-
| rowspan=2|255Fm
| rowspan=2 style="text-align:right" | 100
| rowspan=2 style="text-align:right" | 155
| rowspan=2|255.089964(5)
| rowspan=2|20.07(7) h
| α
| 251Cf
| rowspan=2|7/2+
|-
| SF (2.4×10−5%)
| (various)
|-
| rowspan=2|256Fm
| rowspan=2 style="text-align:right" | 100
| rowspan=2 style="text-align:right" | 156
| rowspan=2|256.091774(8)
| rowspan=2|157.6(13) min
| SF (91.9%)
| (various)
| rowspan=2|0+
|-
| α (8.1%)
| 252Cf
|-
| rowspan=2|257Fm
| rowspan=2 style="text-align:right" | 100
| rowspan=2 style="text-align:right" | 157
| rowspan=2|257.095106(7)
| rowspan=2|100.5(2) d
| α (99.79%)
| 253Cf
| rowspan=2|(9/2+)
|-
| SF (.21%)
| (various)
|-
| 258Fm
| style="text-align:right" | 100
| style="text-align:right" | 158
| 258.09708(22)#
| 370(14) μs
| SF
| (various)
| 0+
|-
| 259Fm
| style="text-align:right" | 100
| style="text-align:right" | 159
| 259.1006(3)#
| 1.5(3) s
| SF
| (various)
| 3/2+#
|-
| 260Fm
| style="text-align:right" | 100
| style="text-align:right" | 160
| 260.10281(55)#
| 4 ms
| SF
| (various)
| 0+

Chronology of isotope discovery 

260Fm was not confirmed in 1997.

References 

 Isotope masses from:

 Isotopic compositions and standard atomic masses from:

 Half-life, spin, and isomer data selected from the following sources.

 
Fermium
Fermium